Günther Josten (7 November 19217 July 2004) was a German Luftwaffe military aviator during World War II, a fighter ace credited with 178 enemy aircraft shot down in 420 combat missions, all of which claimed over the Eastern Front. Following World War II, he served in the newly established West Germany's Air Force in the Bundeswehr.

Josten volunteered for military service in the Luftwaffe of Nazi Germany following outbreak of World War II. He was admitted in 1940 and following flight training, he was posted to the 1st group of Jagdgeschwader 51 "Mölders" (JG 51—51st Fighter Wing) operating on the Eastern Front. He claimed his first aerial victory in February 1943 and after 84 aerial victories, he was awarded the Knight's Cross of the Iron Cross in February 1944. In July 1944, he was appointed squadron leader of the 3. Staffel (3rd squadron) of JG 51 and on 20 July, Josten claimed his 100th victory in aerial combat. After he claimed his 161st aerial victory he was awarded the Knight's Cross of the Iron Cross with Oak Leaves on 28 March 1945. On 12 April 1945, he was appointed group commander of the 4th group of JG 51.

On 5 May 1945, Josten was interned by the British occupational authorities. Following his release, he worked in private industry. Following the rearmament of the Federal Republic of Germany, Josten joined the Air Force of the Bundeswehr in 1956. In 1962, he was appointed wing commander of Jagdgeschwader 71 "Richthofen" (JG 71—71st Fighter Wing). From 1967 to 1970, he was made deputy commander of NATOs System Operations Center in Brockzetel, in Aurich. In October 1970, he was transferred to the Allied Air Forces Central Europe at the Ramstein Air Base. There he led the staff of the aerial defenses. His last service position before he retired in 1981 was deputy commander of the 4th Air Division. Josten, who logged 3,250 flight hours, 1,580 of which were during World War II, died in 2004.

Early life and career
Josten was born on 7 November 1921 in Rhynern, today a borough of Hamm, in the Province of Westphalia during the time of the Weimar Republic. He was the second son, following his older brother Reinhard, of Johannes Josten and his wife Gertraud. His father was the Protestant pastor of Kölleda in Thuringia. In October 1935, the Reichsluftfahrtministerium (Ministry of Aviation) decided to build an airfield at Kölleda which influenced him and his brother to become an aviator. Josten attended the boarding school Schulpforta. The school was made into a National Political Institutes of Education (Nationalpolitische Erziehungsanstalt—Napola), a secondary school founded under the recently established Nazi state, on 16 August 1935. The goal of the Napola schools was to raise a new generation for the political, military and administrative leadership of the Third Reich. On 25 May 1938, Josten made his first rubber powered flight on a DFS 35 glider aircraft with the National Socialist Flyers Corps of Naumburg.

World War II in Europe began on Friday, 1 September 1939, when German forces invaded Poland. Following the start of hostilities, Josten immediately volunteered for military service in the Luftwaffe. The Wehrmacht took its time to accept and process his application. In January 1940, he was ordered to the Fliegerausbildungsstelle (Aviator Training Facility) in Weimar-Nohra and on 11 April, he was posted to Fliegerausbildungs-Regiment 61 (61st Aviators Training Regiment) in Oschatz. At first he feared to become an air gunner but his desire to become a pilot was granted and he was posted to the Luftwaffen-Flugzeugführerschule A/B 4 (flight school for the pilot license) at Prague-Gbell. On 31 August 1940, he was granted leave to return to Schulpforta for his Abitur (diploma) examination which began 19 September. He received news that he had passed his Abitur, a precondition to become an officer, on 23 September and returned to Prague on 2 October. On 18 October 1940, after 63 takeoffs and landings, Josten made his first solo flight on a Focke-Wulf Fw 44 "Stieglitz". On 31 July 1941, Josten received his A/B pilot license and was promoted to Unteroffizier (staff sergeant), the only student of his class to receive this promotion. During flight training, he was trained to fly the Focke-Wulf Fw 44, Fw 56 and Fw 58, the Bücker Bü 131, the Klemm Kl 35, the Junkers W 34, the Gotha Go 145, the Arado Ar 65 and Ar 96, the Heinkel He 70, the Letov Š-328, the Avia B-534, and the North American NA-57.

On 1 August 1941, Josten was transferred to the Jagdfliegervorschule 1 (Pre Fighter Pilot School) in Kamenz under the command of Hauptmann (Captain) Hans-Günther von Kornatzki. He was then transferred to the Jagdgruppe Drontheim, based at the Fliegerhorst Grove in Denmark on 1 November 1941. There, on 9 January 1942, he flew the Messerschmitt Bf 109 fighter aircraft for the first time. On 7 July 1942, he was posted to the Ergänzungs-Jagdgruppe Ost (EJGr Ost—Supplementary Fighter Group, East), a specialized training unit for new fighter pilots destined for the Eastern Front.

World War II
At the end of August 1942, Josten was sent to the Eastern Front and assigned to the 1. Staffel (1st squadron) of Jagdgeschwader 51 "Mölders" (JG 51—51st Fighter Wing), named after the first fighter pilot to claim 100 aerial victories in combat, Oberst (Colonel) Werner Mölders. On 23 February 1943, he claimed his first aerial victory, an Ilyushin Il-2 ground-attack aircraft shot down on a combat air patrol near Zhizdra. On 3 April 1943, Josten received the Iron Cross 2nd Class from his commanding officer. The official documented presentation date for this award was 4 April.

On 15 April 1943, Josten was granted home leave. During this vacation, he visited Dresden where he met with Alice Schmidt, née Wehrsen, for the first time. She was 21 years old, a young war widow, mother of a two-year-old son, Jürgen, and former friend of his brother Reinhard. The two fell in love and married on 13 June 1944.

On 10 July 1943 he scored multiple times for his claims 8 to 10. Three days later on 13 July he shot down 5 Ilyushin Il-2 Sturmovik ground attack aircraft for victories 12 to 16. All in all he claimed 19 victories in July and 30 in August. After a successful September with 26 victories he was transferred to the Luftkriegsschule 4 at Fürstenfeldbruck. He returned to his Staffel on 3 February 1944. Two days later he claimed two Bostons and was awarded the Knight's Cross of the Iron Cross as Oberfeldwebel. He was also promoted to Leutnant (second lieutenant) on account of this achievement, backdated to 1 January 1944. He claimed his 90th victory on 2 May 1944. On 18 September 1944, he was given command of 3. Staffel of JG 51 as Staffelkapitän (squadron leader), succeeding Oberleutnant Walther Weaver who had been wounded in combat on 10 July. On 20 July 1944, Josten was credited with his 100th aerial victory. He was the 85th Luftwaffe pilot to achieve the century mark.

On 18 September 1944, three bombardment groups of the United States Army Air Forces (USAAF) flew to Warsaw on a daylight support mission during the Warsaw Uprising (1 August – 2 October 1944). The force was made up of Boeing B-17 Flying Fortress bombers from 95th, 100th and 390th Bombardment Group, all from the 13th Bombardment Wing, escorted by 73 long range North American P-51 Mustang fighter aircraft. From this bomber force, Josten was credited with the destruction of the B-17 "Til we meet again", piloted by Lieutenant Francis Akins. The attack killed all but two members of the crew, who managed to bail out, including Akins.

By 26 October his score had reached 139 claims. His 150th kill was claimed on 17 February 1945. Following his 161st victory, Josten was awarded the Knight's Cross of the Iron Cross with Oak Leaves on 28 March 1945, the 810th member of the Wehrmacht to be so honored. Josten never received an official presentation of the Oak Leaves themselves nor did he receive the award documentation. Josten was first informed of the fact that he had been so honored by the commanding general of Luftwaffenkommando Ostpreußen (Airforce Command East Prussia), Generalmajor (Major General) Klaus Uebe, on 2 April 1945. On 4 April 1945, Reichsmarschall (Marshal of the Reich) Hermann Göring, the Commander-in-Chief of the Oberkommando der Luftwaffe (Air Force High Command), sent Josten a telegram and congratulated him for his achievements and the presentation of the Oak Leaves.

Group commander

Josten was appointed Gruppenkommandeur (group commander) of IV. Gruppe of JG 51 on 12 April 1945, succeeding Major Heinz Lange. That day, Hauptmann (Captain) Günther Schack, the Gruppenkomandeur of I. Gruppe, was seriously injured in combat. In consequence, Josten briefly took charge of I. Gruppe, delaying his command of VI. Gruppe until 18 April. On 22 April, IV. Gruppe was moved to an airfield at Schmoldow. That day, just prior to the relocation Josten claimed two Il-2 shot down south of Stettin. On 23 April, the commanding general of Luftwaffenkommando Nordost (Air Force Command North East), General der Flieger (General of the Aviators) Martin Fiebig, visited the unit at Schmoldow. Fiebig held a speech, demanding that every German soldier should fight to the end and asked for volunteers to make Kamikaze suicide attacks against the Soviet Oder crossings. The idea was to fly Junkers Ju 88 bombers, loaded with high explosives, into the Oder bridges, none of the pilots from VI. Gruppe volunteered for these missions.

Flying the Focke-Wulf Fw 190 D-9 on 25 April 1945, Josten claimed nine aerial victories, his most successful day as a fighter pilot. On the first mission, leading a flight of three, he was credited with the destruction of one Yak-3 and three Il-2. On the second mission, he and his wingman, Oberfeldwebel Alfred Rauch, together shot down nine aircraft, five by Josten and four by Rauch. On this mission they first encountered 50 Bostons and 30 Airacobra. From this force, Josten shot down one Airacobra and two Bostons. The two then ran into a flight of 20 Il-2 and 30 Yak-3, of which Josten claimed two Il-2 destroyed. Josten claimed his last and 178th aerial victory over a Yak-3 on 26 April 1945. On 6 May 1945, he was taken prisoner by British forces of the RAF Second Tactical Air Force in Flensburg. Legally, according to the international law, Josten and his comrades were not prisoners of war but were interned.

Shortly after the end of the war the British wanted to evaluate the performance of the German Fw 190 D-13/R11 (Werknummer 836017—factory number) which had been assigned to the Geschwaderkommodore of Jagdgeschwader 26, Major Franz Götz. At Flensburg, the British Disarmament Wing wanted to compare the fighter's performance against a Hawker Tempest. On 25 June 1945, Josten and Heinz Lange flew the Fw 190 D-13 in mock combat against a Tempest piloted by a British pilot. The machines proved evenly matched.

Later life and service
Josten was released as a prisoner of war on 31 October 1945 by the No. 2 Squadron RAF at the Kiel-Holtenau airfield. He then became a joiner and worked at a furniture factory. In May 1949, he was hired by the Holzindustriebedarf GmbH, an industrial wood supplies company, in Cologne. After six months, he was put in charge of technical and commercial operations. End of 1950, he was offered a general manager position with a plywood supplier in Koblenz and changed jobs to this company on 1 April 1951. His wife Alice gave birth to their mutual son, Meinhard Gero, on 2 July 1946. He and Alice were divorced on 15 November 1955. Later that year, he was invited to a New Year party in Stolberg (Harz), then in East Germany, by his former school friend Hans Tetzner, Chief Physician of the local hospital. At the party he met Ursula, a pediatrician from Erfurt. The two later married and had two sons, born in 1959 and 1961.

On 4 April 1956, Josten rejoined the military service in the German Air Force, at the time referred to as the Bundesluftwaffe, in the Bundeswehr. He attended a number of training courses with the 7351st and 7330th Flying Training Wing of the United States Air Force (USAF) and the Canadian 427 Special Operations Aviation Squadron and was promoted to Hauptmann on 22 November 1956. He then served with the Waffenschule 10 (10th Weapon School) in Oldenburg and later as a Staffelkapitän in Jagdgeschwader 73 (JG 73—73rd Fighter Wing). During these assignments, he was promoted to Major (major) on 6 March 1959.

On 30 May 1962, Josten succeeded Erich Hartmann as Geschwaderkommodore (wing commander) of Jagdgeschwader 71 "Richthofen" (JG 71—71st Fighter Wing), named after the World War I fighter ace Manfred von Richthofen. It was under his command that JG 71 reequipped the Canadair Sabre with the U.S.-made Lockheed F-104 Starfighter. There, he was promoted to Oberstleutnant (lieutenant colonel) on 3 June 1962 and to Oberst on 14 June 1965. Josten was interviewed by the Christian Democratic Union (CDU) politician Carl Damm during the investigation of the Starfighter-Affäre (Starfighter Crisis), the high loss rate of Bundesluftwaffe operated F-104 Starfighters.

On 1 April 1967, Josten was made deputy commander of NATOs System Operations Center in Brockzetel, in Aurich. On 1 October 1970, he was transferred to the Allied Air Forces Central Europe at the Ramstein Air Base. There he led the staff of the aerial defenses. His last service position before he retired in 1981 was deputy commander of the 4. Luftwaffendivision (4th Air Division). Josten, who had retired from active service on 31 March 1981, was a member of the Gemeinschaft der Jagdflieger (Association of German Armed Forces Airmen). He died on 7 July 2004 in Aurich, Lower Saxony.

Summary of career

Aerial victory claims
According to US historian David T. Zabecki, Josten was credited with 178 aerial victories. Spick also lists Josten with 178 aerial victories claimed in 420 combat missions, all of which were on the Eastern Front. He further claimed 25 unconfirmed victories and was never shot down in combat.

Mathews and Foreman, authors of Luftwaffe Aces – Biographies and Victory Claims, researched the German Federal Archives and found records for 178 aerial victory claims, plus 13 further unconfirmed claims. This number includes one claim over a United States Army Air Forces flown B-17 Flying Fortress, and 177 Soviet Air Forces piloted aircraft on the Eastern Front.

Victory claims were logged to a map-reference (PQ = Planquadrat), for example "PQ 44793". These sectors were then subdivided into 36 smaller units to give a location area 3 × 4 km in size.

Awards
 Iron Cross (1939)
 2nd Class (4 April 1943)
 1st Class (12 July 1943)
 Honor Goblet of the Luftwaffe (Ehrenpokal der Luftwaffe) on 20 September 1943 as Feldwebel and pilot
 German Cross in Gold on 17 October 1943 as Feldwebel in the 1./Jagdgeschwader 51
 Knight's Cross of the Iron Cross with Oak Leaves
 Knight's Cross on 5 February 1944 as Oberfeldwebel and pilot in the 3./Jagdgeschwader 51 "Mölders"
 810th Oak Leaves on 28 March 1945 as Oberleutnant and Staffelkapitän of the 3./Jagdgeschwader 51 "Mölders"

Dates of rank

Notes

References

Citations

Bibliography

 
 
 
 
 
 
 
 
 
 
 
 
 
 
 
 
 
 
 

1921 births
2004 deaths
German World War II flying aces
German Air Force pilots
Luftwaffe pilots
People from the Province of Westphalia
Recipients of the Gold German Cross
Recipients of the Knight's Cross of the Iron Cross with Oak Leaves
Officers Crosses of the Order of Merit of the Federal Republic of Germany
German prisoners of war in World War II held by the United Kingdom
National Socialist Flyers Corps members
Military personnel from Hamm